Neurosia: 50 Years of Perversity (German:  Neurosia - 50 Jahre pervers )  is a 1995 German film directed by Rosa von Praunheim.

For example, the film was shown at the Chicago International Film Festival in 1995 and at the International Film Festival Rotterdam in 1996.

Plot
An ironic life review of Rosa von Praunheim based on a fictional story about his murder. For a sensational story about the victim, an idiosyncratic TV reporter tries to unravel details about the director's life. Meanwhile, the police are groping in the dark trying to solve the case. But as always when it comes to the murder of a gay man, the officers are certain that the killer is to be found in the gay scene.

Awards
 1995: FIPRESCI Award at the Locarno International Film Festival
 1996: Best Feature Film Award at the Torino Gay & Lesbian International Film Festival

Reception
The journalist Allen Barra wrote: "Neurosia: 50 Years of Perversity is one of the funniest and most inventive German comedies ever made, a murder-mystery in a form of a mock-documentary." (The Star-Ledger)

References

 Kuzniar, Alice A, The Queer German Cinema, Stanford University Press, 2000,

External links

1995 films
Films directed by Rosa von Praunheim
1990s mockumentary films
1990s German films